Bessie Marchant (1862–1941) was a prolific English writer of adventure novels featuring young female heroines. She was married at age 27 to Jabez Ambrose Comfort, a Baptist minister 28 years her senior. She began writing for publication shortly after her daughter Constance was born in 1891. She published most of her work under the name Bessie Marchant, but occasionally published as Bessie Marchant Comfort or Mrs J.A. Comfort. And a few books for boys, published under the name John Comfort are attributed to her.

Marchant was born at Debden Court Farm, Petham in Kent, and despite never leaving England herself, she wrote close to 150 novels set in locations around the world. Her earliest novels, such as 'Broken Barriers' and 'Under Clear Skies' were simple romances set in an evangelical Christian context, usually Primitive Methodism, and located in England. Some of her novels were serialized in illustrated magazines such as "Sunday Reading for the Young", and some were published in combination books such as "The Bessie Marchant Omnibus Book ", which contains three novels: "The Gold-Marked Charm", "Sally Makes Good", and "Three Girls in Mexico". She later wrote many novels in the style of the Victorian adventure novel (even being called "the girls' Henty", a reference to G.A. Henty, the author of popular adventure stories for boys), but she challenged established gender roles by putting strong female characters in what was seen as a boys' genre.

The typical Bessie Marchant heroine may be reluctant, unsure of herself, homesick, and frightened, but she puts aside her feelings in an effort to do her duty and do the right thing. Here is a passage from "The Adventures of Phyllis", where a young woman finds herself alone, looking after a delirious injured man. "... Besides, it was selfish to think of her own discomfort or possible danger when his condition was plainly so much worse than her own. All the latent heroism in her nature was rising now to meet the demand upon it. She would not let herself speculate on what her home people would say if they could see her now; she would not even think of what might befall her before she could extricate herself from this strange situation, but content herself with living just for the present hour, and doing her best to meet each need as it should arise."

Early publications of Bessie Marchant novels typically have no dust jacket, but have an illustrative image printed directly on the cover and spine. This is especially true of those published by Blackie and by Collins. See the image below showing the cover for the novel Juliette the Mail Carrier, as published by Collins Clear Type Press.

Novels 
Listed here are some of the novels written by Bessie Marchant. This list was compiled based on books offered for sale on amazon.com, barnesandnoble.com, abebooks.com and/or referenced on goodreads.com. Where these books are available in formats other than print, this is noted in the Available Formats column. The Publication Date is rarely included in the printed copies of Marchant's works; apparently this was common practice in books printed in the early 20th century. Where a publication date is shown, it was discovered through on-line references, such as entries in goodreads.com, so it cannot be guaranteed to be correct. However, because Bessie Marchant books were popular choices for prize-giving or birthday and Christmas presents, an inscription is often found with a date. This date is listed as the 'presentation date', and can be understood to indicate that the book was published prior to that date. Publication Date has been added based on the work of the website www.authorandbookinfo.com. The plot summaries shown below are based on reading the book referenced.

Listed below are books attributed to Bessie Marchant published under the name John Comfort.

References 

 
 
Alan Major (1991). "Bessie Marchant: the Maid of Kent whose exciting stories thrilled thousands of English children". pp 30–33. This England magazine, Winter 1991.

External links
 
 
 
 
 "Marchant, Bessie (1862–1941)." Women in World History: A Biographical Encyclopedia. Encyclopedia.com at Marchant, Bessie (1862–1941) | Encyclopedia.com

1862 births
1941 deaths
English women novelists